The Vanwall 254 is a four-stroke  DOHC naturally-aspirated straight-four engine, designed, developed and built by British manufacturer Vanwall, for the Vanwall Grand Prix series of cars, between 1954 and 1960.

References

Straight-four engines
Formula One engines